West Liberty United Methodist Church, is a historically black United Methodist Church located on Sand Hill road in Marriottsville, Maryland.

The building was constructed in 1890.

See also

Asbury Methodist Episcopal Church (Annapolis Junction, Maryland)
Brown Chapel United Methodist Church
Daisy United Methodist Church
First Baptist Church of Elkridge
Hopkins United Methodist Church
Locust United Methodist Church
Mt. Moriah Lodge No. 7
St. Stephens African Methodist Episcopal Church

References

African-American history of Howard County, Maryland
Howard County, Maryland landmarks
Buildings and structures in Marriottsville, Maryland
Churches completed in 1890